Querquecocha (possibly from Quechua khirki armadillo / very rough, qucha lake, "armadillo lake" or "rough lake") is a lake in Peru located in the Cusco Region, Chumbivilcas Province, Velille District. Querquecocha lies south-east of Velille and north of the lake Orccococha.

References 

Lakes of Peru
Lakes of Cusco Region